S. erythraea may refer to:
 Saccharopolyspora erythraea, a bacterium species
 Sporocladopsis erythraea, an alga species in the genus Sporocladopsis

Synonyms
 Sillago erythraea, a synonym for Sillago sihama, a fish species

See also
 Erythraea (disambiguation)
 S. erythraeae (disambiguation)